Từ Sơn is a city of Bắc Ninh Province in the Red River Delta region of Vietnam. As of 2021, Từ Sơn had a population of 202,874, covering an area of 61.08 km². The district capital lies at Từ Sơn.

In 974, Lý Thái Tổ was born in this town and the Lý Bát Đế Shrine is located here.

References

Districts of Bắc Ninh province
 
Cities in Vietnam